Believe (also known as Believe Music; previously known as Believe Digital) is a global digital music company headquartered in France. Believe has several brands including TuneCore, Nuclear Blast, Naïve, Groove Attack and AllPoints.

History

Beginnings 
The company was founded in 2005 by Denis Ladegaillerie, Arnaud Chiaramonti and Nicolas Laclias.

The company operates from Paris, and was introduced on Euronext marketplace in June 2021. Believe also has a subsidiary in Luxembourg (Believe International) which serves as a hub for the digital distribution.

Growth 
Believe's expansion was fuelled by $60m growth capital investment from Technology Crossover Ventures (TCV) and XAnge. In August 2016, the company acquired the French independent label Naive Records for €10m, seeking to improve value from the company's extensive back catalogue, and restarted the label's issuing of new recordings as physical CDs in 2017.

In 2021, Believe generated $682M in annual revenues, increasing compared to the previous year.

The company has embarked on an expansion drive in developing digital music markets such as Russia and India.

Copyright controversy 
Believe has been accused of copyright trolling, particularly on YouTube, where it has been alleged to engage in claiming copyright for works that are either copyright free or that they do not own the rights to. The company was the subject of a New York federal lawsuit alleging that they were behind large scale, willful copyright infringement.

Acquisition 
In 2015, Believe announced the acquisition of Musicast. The same year, TuneCore, the U.S. digital distribution company is acquired by Believe Digital.

In 2016, Believe acquired Naïve.

In 2018, Believe finalized the acquisition of the German metal label Nuclear Blast, another German label Groove Attack and took 49% stake in Lili Louise Musique. In September 2018, Believe acquired a 49% stake in French indie label Tôt ou Tard from Wagram Music.

In 2019, Believe acquired Mumbai live event production specialist Entco, and rebranded the company “Believe Entertainment”. The same year, Believe acquired three other Indian companies : Bollywood music specialist Venus Music Private Ltd, Entco Music Private Ltd.(production of live events) and Canvas Talent Private Ltd, India-based artist services, development and booking company, specialized in services for artists. In the same year, Believe took 49% stake in 6&7 SAS.

In 2020, the company acquired a majority stake (60%) in the DMC label in Turkey, for €18.8 million, a stake in Ircam Amplify, an entity of the Institut de Recherche et de Coordination Acoustique/Musique (IRCAM), and the assets of SoundsGoood, specialized in the creation of playlists on streaming platforms.

In 2021, Believe took a 25% stake in Play Two, France's leading independent music label and a subsidiary of the TF1 group. The same year, Believe acquired 15% stake in Philippines-based Viva Music And Artists Group, 51% stake in French Indie label Jo&Co, and a 76% stake in South India-based label Think Music.

Awards 
In September 2019, the French government identified Believe as one of the 40 most promising French start-ups, with the French Tech Next40 index. In October 2019, Believe was named Europe’s “Allstar” company at the 17th Annual Investor Allstars awards in London.

References

2005 establishments in France
2021 initial public offerings
Digital audio distributors
French record labels
Record labels established in 2005
Internet fraud
Companies listed on Euronext Paris